Murrah may refer to:

Places
Murrah, Cumbria, hamlet in Cumbria, England
Murrah High School, public high school in Jackson, Mississippi 
Murrah River, river in New South Wales, Australia
Alfred P. Murrah Federal Building, US federal government complex in downtown Oklahoma City, Oklahoma, target of the Oklahoma City bombing

People
Alfred P. Murrah (1904–1975), American attorney and judge
Al Murrah, a nomadic tribe of the Arabian peninsula.
Murrah ibn Ka'b paternal ancestor of the Islamic prophet, Muhammed

Other uses
Murrah buffalo, breed of water buffalo